Longidorus africanus is a plant pathogenic nematode.

See also 
 List of sorghum diseases

References

External links 
 Nemaplex, University of California - Longidorus africanus

Diplogasteria
Agricultural pest nematodes
Sorghum diseases